Phallus multicolor is a species of fungus in the family Phallaceae or "stinkhorns".

Description and range
It is similar in overall appearance to Phallus indusiatus, but it has a more brightly coloured cap, stipe and indusium, and it is usually smaller. It is found in Australia, Guam, Sumatra, Java, Borneo, Papua New Guinea, DRC, and Tobago as well as Hawaii and New Caledonia.

It is typically found in tropical/subtropical climates.

References

External links

Fungi described in 1882
Fungi of Africa
Fungi of Australia
Taxa named by Miles Joseph Berkeley
Taxa named by Christopher Edmund Broome
Fungi without expected TNC conservation status